Christopher Catesby Harington (born 26 December 1986) is an English actor. He is known for his role as Jon Snow in the HBO epic fantasy television series Game of Thrones (2011–2019).

After studying at the Royal Central School of Speech and Drama, Harington made his professional acting debut with the lead role of Albert Narracott in the West End play War Horse in 2009. He has received several awards, including a Golden Globe Award nomination and two Primetime Emmy Awards nominations.Harington developed, produced, and starred in the 2017 BBC drama series Gunpowder, based around the leading role of his ancestor Robert Catesby in the Gunpowder plot. His film roles include the historical romance film Pompeii (2014), the British period drama Testament of Youth (2014), and the Marvel Cinematic Universe film Eternals (2021). He also voiced Eret in the second and third films of the How to Train Your Dragon film series (2014–19).

Early life and ancestry

Christopher Catesby Harington was born on 26 December 1986 in the Acton district of London. His mother named him after Christopher Marlowe, whose first name was shortened to Kit, a name Harington prefers. He did not learn what his full name was until age eleven. His parents are Sir David Harington, 15th Baronet, a businessman, and former playwright Deborah Jane. Through his father, Harington descends from Scottish politician Henry Dundas, 1st Viscount Melville. Harington is related to men who were involved on opposite sides of the Gunpowder Plot. He claims a family connection with the leader of the plot, Robert Catesby, on his mother's side, while through his father's side, he is related to King James I, the target of the assassination attempt, and to Lord Harington, who was in the Houses of Parliament that Catesby and his co-conspirators tried to blow up.

Harington was educated at Southfield Primary School from 1992 to 1998. When he was eleven, the family moved to Worcestershire and he attended Chantry High School in Martley until 2003. He became interested in acting after seeing a production of Waiting for Godot when he was fourteen, and he performed in several school productions. He attended Worcester Sixth Form College, where he studied Drama and Theatre (2003–05). When he was seventeen, he was inspired to attend a drama school after seeing a performance by Ben Whishaw as Hamlet in 2004. Harington moved back to London in 2005 aged eighteen after completing Sixth Form and, later that year, enrolled at the Central School of Speech and Drama, where he graduated in 2008.

Career

2008–2010: Early work in theatre
Before acting, Harington originally wanted to become a journalist. While still at drama school, he landed the role of Albert in the National Theatre's adaptation of War Horse. The play won two Olivier Awards and gained Harington a great deal of recognition. He was later cast in his second play Posh, a dark ensemble comedy about upper-class men attending Oxford University.

2011–present: Breakthrough with Game of Thrones and film roles

After War Horse, Harington auditioned for and landed his first television role as Jon Snow in the series Game of Thrones. The show debuted in 2011 to great critical acclaim and was quickly picked up by the network for a second season. Harington's role was largely filmed in Iceland and Northern Ireland. The series concluded its run with its eighth season in April 2019. Game of Thrones takes place on the fictional continents of Westeros and Essos and chronicles the power struggles among noble families as they fight for control of the Iron Throne of the Seven Kingdoms. Jon Snow is introduced as the illegitimate son of Ned Stark, the honourable lord of Winterfell, an ancient fortress in the North of the fictional continent of Westeros.

Harington received critical praise for his portrayal of Snow. In 2012, he was nominated for a Saturn Award for Best Supporting Actor on Television for the role. In 2016, Harington was nominated for a Primetime Emmy Award for Outstanding Supporting Actor in a Drama Series. In 2017, Harington had reportedly become one of the highest-paid actors on television, earning £2 million per episode of Game of Thrones.

Harington made his feature film debut in 2012 as Vincent in Silent Hill: Revelation 3D. The horror film was based on the survival horror video game Silent Hill 3, and was a sequel to the film Silent Hill. He was honoured with Actor of the Year at the Young Hollywood Awards 2013, which celebrates the best emerging young talent in film, music and television.

Harington's first major lead role in a feature film occurred when he played Milo in the film Pompeii. Production for the film commenced in 2013 and took place in and around Toronto, Ontario, Canada. Some scenes were also shot in the actual city of Pompeii itself. The film was panned by critics and a modest box office success. That year, Harington also voiced Eret in the DreamWorks Animation film How to Train Your Dragon 2, which was a critically acclaimed box office success, won the Golden Globe Award for Best Animated Feature Film and received an Academy Award nomination.

In 2014, Harington also appeared alongside Jeff Bridges in the film Seventh Son, a poorly received fantasy–adventure film. Harington played Billy Bradley, Bridges' first apprentice killed early in the film by a character played by Julianne Moore. Ben Barnes, Alicia Vikander and Emily Watson also star. The film was released in wide distribution in the UK on 16 January 2015. Its world premiere was in The Centrepiece Gala, supported by the Mayor of London, at the British Film Institute London Film Festival in October 2014.

In December 2014, it was announced that he would star in Xavier Dolan's upcoming film The Death and Life of John F. Donovan. On 1 August 2018, it was announced that the film would have its world premiere at the 2018 Toronto International Film Festival. The film received poor reviews.

He starred in the 2015 HBO comedy 7 Days in Hell, a short film about a seven-day tennis match. In June 2015, it was confirmed that Harington would star in Martin Koolhoven's upcoming western thriller film Brimstone, replacing Robert Pattinson.

In 2016, Harington starred as Salen Kotch, the main villain in the first-person shooter video game Call of Duty: Infinite Warfare. That same year he starred in a West End production of Doctor Faustus. The production, as well as his performance received unfavourable critical reviews.

In February 2017, it was reported that Harington would write, star in and executive produce Gunpowder, a three-part historical drama for BBC based on the real story of the Gunpowder Plot. He played the role of his ancestor Robert Catesby alongside actors Mark Gatiss, Liv Tyler and Peter Mullan.

In June 2018, it was announced that Harington would star in the West End upcoming stage play True West, written by Sam Shepard and directed by Matthew Dunster. The play premiered in November 2018 at the Vaudeville Theatre in London and closed in February 2019.

In 2020, he took part in a virtual performance of an extract from the play Burn by playwright Chris Thompson.

In September 2020, it was announced that he would appear in the second season of the Netflix anthology series Criminal: UK. The series premiered on 16 September to positive reviews.

In August 2019, Harington joined the Marvel Cinematic Universe in an undisclosed role. The role was later revealed to be Dane Whitman in Chloé Zhao's Eternals. The film was released in November 2021.

Upcoming projects
In May 2022, it was announced that Harington would star in Mary’s Monster, a film about author Mary Shelley's mental struggle to write her 1818 novel Frankenstein. That same month, he also joined Scoot McNairy and Josh Lucas in the action thriller Blood for Dust. In June 2022, Game of Thrones author George R. R. Martin revealed that a Jon Snow spin-off series was in early development, and that it was Harington who first brought the idea for the project.

Personal life 
As of 2015, Harington lives in Canonbury, London. In 2017, he purchased a £1.75 million 15th-century country home outside Ipswich, Suffolk.

Harington began a relationship with his Game of Thrones co-star Rose Leslie in 2011. They announced their engagement through the 'Forthcoming Marriages' section of The Times on 27 September 2017.

On 23 June 2018, the couple married at Rayne Parish Church in Aberdeenshire, Scotland. In September 2020, Leslie posed for a magazine photo shoot visibly pregnant. They had a son, first spotted in February 2021. In February 2023, Harington announced he and Leslie are expecting their second child.

In May 2019, Harington checked into a mental health and wellness facility to seek help for "some personal issues".

Harington is a football fan and a supporter of Manchester United.

Charity work
In 2015, Harington joined a cast including Benedict Cumberbatch, Nicole Kidman, James McAvoy and Christopher Eccleston in a charity production of The Children's Monologues, conceived by Oscar-winning director Danny Boyle. The performance took place at the Royal Court Theatre in London, on 25 October. Proceeds went to Boyle's creative arts charity Dramatic Need, which helps vulnerable children in South Africa and Rwanda to build hope and self-belief in the face of conflict, trauma and hardship.

Since April 2016, Harington has been an ambassador for The Royal Mencap Society; a leading organisation in the United Kingdom helping people with learning difficulties that also provides support for their families and caregivers. On 16 April 2016, he was appointed as a patron of Longlands Care Farm, a charity located on a working livestock farm in Worcestershire, in which they care for, mentor and support disadvantaged and vulnerable young people aged 14 – 19 who are not succeeding in mainstream education. On 12 September 2016, Harington, as well as Cate Blanchett, Chiwetel Ejiofor, Peter Capaldi, Douglas Booth, Neil Gaiman, Keira Knightley, Juliet Stevenson, Jesse Eisenberg, and Stanley Tucci, featured in a video from the United Nations' refugee agency UNHCR to help raise awareness of the global refugee crisis. The video, titled "What They Took With Them", has the actors reading a poem, written by Jenifer Toksvig and inspired by primary accounts of refugees, and is part of UNHCR's #WithRefugees campaign, which also includes a petition to governments to expand asylum to provide further shelter, integrating job opportunities, and education.

In August 2017, with a video backing Mencap #StopSleepInCrisis, Harington called on the government to fund six years' back pay for overnight carers. In a personal message of support, Harington said: "The learning disability sector in the UK is on the brink of crisis. It is faced with a back-pay bill of £400 million which it cannot pay. Many of the providers of this essential, 'sleep-in' service, face bankruptcy. And some of the most vulnerable people in our society will be left, without care, without hope and without an independent future. Stand with Mencap and stand with the incredible people our colleagues support and care for every day."

In 2018, he joined Tom Hiddleston, Kristin Scott Thomas, Jeremy Irons and Indira Varma among others for a one-off charity gala celebrating the life and work of Harold Pinter,  directed by Jamie Lloyd. The event Happy Birthday, Harold took place at the Harold Pinter Theatre in London, on 10 October and comprised a varied programme of Pinter's work. Proceeds went to Amnesty International and Chance to Shine – two of Pinter's favoured charities.

In 2022, during the Russian invasion of Ukraine, Harington supported a humanitarian campaign by starring in a video where he asked to help Ukrainian refugees. Harington auctioned off signed Game of Thrones memorabilia to support Ukraine.

Filmography

Film

Television

Radio

Video games

Theatre

Awards and nominations

References

External links

 
 
 

1986 births
Living people
21st-century English male actors
Alumni of the Royal Central School of Speech and Drama
English male film actors
English male stage actors
English male television actors
English male video game actors
English male voice actors
English people of Scottish descent
Kit
Male actors from London
People from Acton, London
Younger sons of baronets